Villa Nobel is a historic villa situated in Sanremo, Italy.

History 
The construction of the villa, built in 1871 and designed by architect Filippo Grossi, was commissioned by Rivoli pharmacist Pietro Vacchieri. On July 28, 1874, Vacchieri sold the property to Lazzaro Patrone, who in turn re-sold it to Swedish scientist Alfred Nobel in 1891.

In 1892, the new owner commissioned architect Pio Soli to completely renovate the villa. A new floor and a mansard roof were thus added. Alfred Nobel lived in the villa the last years of his life, and died there on December 10, 1896.

Description 
The villa originally featured a Moorish Revival style. Later renovations accentuated the extravagance of the building.

Gallery

References

External links

Villa Nobel Official Website—

Villas in Sanremo